Ahmed Al-Oufi (born January 15, 1992) is a football plays as a winger.

References

External links 
 

1992 births
Living people
Al-Ahli Saudi FC players
Al-Fateh SC players
Ittihad FC players
Ohod Club players
Al-Adalah FC players
Saudi Arabian footballers
Sportspeople from Jeddah
Saudi Professional League players
Saudi First Division League players
Association football wingers